The Dumpy Books for Children were a series of small-format books selected by E. V. Lucas and published by British publisher Grant Richards between 1897 and 1904. Subsequent books were published by Chatto & Windus and by Sampson, Low.

Books in the collection

References

External links
The Dumpy Books

Lists of children's books